Phostria citrinalis is a moth in the family Crambidae. It was described by Herbert Druce in 1895. It is found in Mexico (Guerrero, Jalisco), Costa Rica, Guatemala and Panama.

The forewings and hindwings are uniform dark citron yellow. The head, thorax and abdomen are also citron yellow, the latter is whitish beneath.

References

Phostria
Moths described in 1895
Moths of Central America